Hojjatabad-e Sofla (also Romanized as Ḩojjatābād-e Soflá) is a village in Shohada Rural District, in the Central District of Meybod County, Yazd Province, Iran. At the 2006 census, its population was 497, in 141 families.

References 

Populated places in Meybod County